Gerardo Enrique Vallejo (born 12 March 1976 in Medellín) is a Colombian former footballer who played as a defender with Itagüí S.A.

He previously played for Envigado and Deportivo Cali.

He had been capped by the Colombia national football team and played against France and Japan in the 2003 FIFA Confederations Cup.

References

1976 births
Living people
Colombian footballers
Footballers from Medellín
Colombia international footballers
2003 FIFA Confederations Cup players
2003 CONCACAF Gold Cup players
2007 Copa América players
Envigado F.C. players
Deportes Tolima footballers
Deportivo Cali footballers
Águilas Doradas Rionegro players
Categoría Primera A players
Association football defenders